Geoffrey Barron may refer to:

Geoffrey Barron, fictional character, see Technocrat (comics)
Geoffrey Baron (rebel) (or Barron; 1607–1651), Irish rebel

See also
Geoffrey Baron (disambiguation)